Dodecocerus is a monotypic genus in the family Cerambycidae containing the single species Dodecocerus poirieri. It was described by Dalens and Touroult in 2008.

References 

Cerambycinae
Beetles described in 2008
Monotypic Cerambycidae genera